Greybull High School is a public high school in Greybull, Wyoming, United States. It is part of Big Horn County School District #3 and serves students in grades 9–12. The school's mascot is the Buffalos, or "Buffs."

Notable alumni
 Brett Keisel, former Pittsburgh Steelers defensive end

References

Public high schools in Wyoming
Schools in Big Horn County, Wyoming